The stellate veins are veins that lie beneath the fibrous tunic of the kidney. They are stellate in arrangement and are derived from the capillary network, into which the terminal branches of the interlobular arteries break up. These join to form the interlobular veins, which pass inward between the rays.

See also
 renal circulation

References

External links
 

Kidney anatomy